St. Eugene Catholic Church was a Roman Catholic church in Grand Chenier, Louisiana. It was established in 1961 by the Most Reverend Maurice Schexnayder, Bishop of Lafayette. It was one of the most isolated of Louisiana church parishes, in the southernmost reaches of the Gulf Coast. Due to total destruction from hurricanes in 2020, it was closed.

History 
1890 January

Sacred Heart of Creole was established. The Catholic community of Grand Chenier was first a part of Sacred Heart Parish. The parish was 160 miles wide, stretching from Hackberry and Johnson Bayou to the west, Grand Lake to the north and Grand Chenier to the east.

1892 December

The first pastor was Fr. John Engberink, a Dutch priest from the Netherlands. He travel by horseback, boat and by foot to reach his areas. He built the first chapel in December, 1892, now known as Immaculate Conception in Grand Chenier, on property donated by Mr. & Mrs. Alcide Miller.

1902

Fr. Hubert Cramers built St. Martin Church, on east Grand Chenier on land donated by Mr. & Mrs. George Mayne.

1936

St. Martin Church was replaced by St. Eugene in 1936 under Fr. Francis Bischof on land donated by Mr. & Mrs. Pierre Montie.

1957 June 27

Destroyed by Hurricane Audrey

1961

The Rev. Joseph Decoteau, M.S., later pastor of Our Lady of LaSalette Parish in Sulphur LA, was the founding pastor. St. Eugene Church was built in 1961 under his guidance, with the help of generous people.

Pastors 1890 – 1962 
Priests who served the Grand Chenier Catholic community before the establishment of a parish:

 Fr. John Engberink (1890–95)
 Fr. W.J. Teurlings (1895–99)
 Fr. Theoph Stenmans (1899)
 Fr. Joseph Drolet (1899)
 Fr. Hubert Cramers (1899-1902)
 Fr. J. Smith (1902–03)
 Fr. P. Cambiaire (1903–07)
 Fr. J. Hoes (1907–13)
 Fr. J. Heil (1913–14)
 Fr. P. Buissink (1914–18)
 Fr. Odelon Brise (1919–21)
 Fr. A. Rousseau (1921–22)
 Fr. L. Perronnet (1922–27)
 Fr. C. Merriemboer (1927–30)
 Fr. Francis Bischof (1930–45)
 Fr. Theodore Hassink (1945–48)
 Fr. E. Chartier, M.S. (1948–53)
 Fr. A. Gilbert, M.S. (1953–60)
 Fr. Joseph Decoteau, M.S. (1960–62)

Pastors 1962 – 1994 
A new St. Eugene Parish was established in June, 1962 with Immaculate Conception as its Mission Chapel. Fr. Joseph Decoteau, who was then pastor of Sacred Heart Church in Creole, officially became its first pastor, then moved from Creole to Grand Chenier and stayed in a home given by a parishioner.

Pastors who served the parish:

 Rev. John DeLeeuw (1965- 1967)
 Rev. Charles Soileau (1967-1969)
 Rev. Henry Eugene Ory (1969-1972)
 Rev. Tolson Jones (1972 -1974)
 Rev. Edward Degeyter was pastor for six months (1974)
 Rev. A. L. Bedard December of the same year (1974-1976)
 Rev. Joseph Woerdeman (1976-1977)
 Rev. Roland Vaughn (1977-1984)
 Rev. Robert Shreve (1984-1992)
 Rev. Mark Broussard (1992-1994)
 Fr. Vincent Vadakkedath (1994- )

St. Eugene parish was 22 miles long and 8 miles wide, stretching from Superior Canal to the east, Mermentau River to the west, Gulf of Mexico to the south and Chenier Perdue to the north. In 1994 it consisted of about 200 families, many of which were cattlemen, farmers, fishermen, and oilfield workers.

2005 September 24

The church sustained extreme damage from Hurricane Rita

2008 September 13

The church sustained extreme damage from Hurricane Ike

Sexual abuse scandal 
source
caption: Former priest set for trial on Feb. 4, 2013

2012 March 22

Calcasieu Parish Sheriff's Office and LA State Police, arrested Mark Broussard, 56, on Thursday, March 22. Accused of inappropriate behavior with an 8-year-old between the years of 1986 and 1989. Broussard left St. Henry's Catholic Church in 1992 and relocated to St. Eugene Catholic Church in Grand Chenier. He resigned from the priesthood in 1994.

2012 Aug 27

During arraignment, Mark Anthony Broussard pleaded not guilty to 10 charges; two counts of aggravated rape, three counts molestation of a juvenile, two counts aggravated oral sexual battery, two counts oral sexual battery and sexual battery.
Broussard is currently in jail with bond set at $3.4 million and his trial is set for Feb. 4, 2013.

Annual Fundraiser 
The St. Eugene Alligator Festival, a fundraiser was held annually on the first Sunday in October at the Grand Chenier State Park in Grand Chenier, Louisiana.

References

Roman Catholic churches in Louisiana
Churches in Cameron Parish, Louisiana
Religious organizations established in 1890
Religious organizations disestablished in 2020